, better known by his stage name , is a Japanese comedian who specializes in impersonations of sportspeople.

Biography 
Okumura was born in Gifu Prefecture on 3 November 1965.

External links
  
 Ōta Productions profile 

1965 births
Living people
Japanese comedians
People from Gifu Prefecture
Japanese male professional wrestlers
F-1 Tag Team Champions